Woolly locoweed is a common name for several plants and may refer to:

Astragalus mollissimus, native to the southwestern United States
Oxytropis lambertii